Eikesdalsvatnet is a lake in Molde Municipality in Møre og Romsdal county, Norway. The village of Eikesdalen is located at the southern end of the lake. Average depth is 89 meters (which is 67 meters below sea level) such that most of the lake's volume is below sea level.

Its main inflows are the river Aura, flowing northwest from the lake Aursjøen, and the river Mardøla with the famous waterfall Mardalsfossen. The lake flows out through the River Eira which flows into the Eresfjorden.

See also
List of lakes in Norway

References

Molde
Lakes of Møre og Romsdal